Osetnik  is a settlement in the administrative district of Gmina Choczewo, within Wejherowo County, Pomeranian Voivodeship, in northern Poland. It is located on the Slovincian Coast in the historic region of Pomerania.

References

Osetnik